Bückeburg (Northern Low Saxon: Bückeborg) is a town in Lower Saxony, Germany, on the border with North Rhine Westphalia. It is located in the district of Schaumburg close to the northern slopes of the Weserbergland ridge. Population: 21,030.

History
Bückeburg was once the capital of the tiny principality of Schaumburg-Lippe. Houses began to gather around the castle  and were protected by a city wall in the 17th century. In the 19th century, it was connected to the Minden and Hanover Railway and housed a synagogue. The poet J. G. von Herder was court preacher here from 1771 to 1776.

Bückeburg is a former British garrison town and had a number of British residents until recently. Most of the British residents worked at the British Military Hospital (BMH) in Rinteln, or in the local English Prince Rupert School, also in Rinteln. The number of British military residents in Bückeburg decreased significantly in the late 1990s, when BMH Rinteln closed down, however the staff of Prince Rupert School were still based in Bückeburg until the closure of the school in July 2014.

Buildings

Bückeburg Palace

Bückeburg Palace (Schloss Bückeburg) was the residence of the Princes of Schaumburg-Lippe. Although the Princely family surrendered political power in 1918, they still live there today. The palace, part of which is open to the public, is an important major tourist sight and houses important works of art and an important library. The history of the building spans 700 years, with the most important contributions stemming from the 16th, 17th, and 19th centuries.

The Princely Mausoleum in the palace grounds is open to the public as well. Built in 1915 in Neo-Romanic style and resembling the Roman Pantheon, it is the world's largest private sepulchre still in use. The cupola is adorned by an impressive gold mosaic, the second largest of its kind after the one in the Hagia Sophia.

In the period around 1950 when the Royal Air Force had a base nearby, the children of the service families attended a school in the Schloss.

Helicopter Museum
Bückeburg is also home to a helicopter museum, which features the early drawings of flying objects by Leonardo da Vinci as well as 40 actual helicopters. The German Army's Army Aviators School using Bückeburg Air Base is located here.

Bückeburg Church

The Town Church of Bückeburg (Bückeburger Stadtkirche) was one of the first Lutheran churches built after the Reformation. It is known for its pulpit and especially for the ornately decorated bronze-cast font, made by the Dutch artist Adriaen de Vries. Composer Johann Christoph Friedrich Bach (1732–1795), a son of J.S. Bach, worked at the Bückeburg court from before 1751 until his death, first as a harpsichordist, then, from 1759, as Konzertmeister (director) of the Hofkapelle (court orchestra) there. Bach is buried in the churchyard of the Stadtkirchengemeinde-Bückeburg. Bach set several texts by Johann Gottfried Herder, who was at the Bückeburg court as its superintendent and chief preacher from 1771–1776.

Transport
Bückeburg has a railway station and is served by line S1 of the Hanover S-Bahn. There are hourly train services between Bückeburg, Minden and Hanover.

Notable people 

 Thomas Abbt (1738–1766), writer and philosopher, Government and consistorial council as well as Patronus scholarum
 Hans Blum (born 1928), pianist, bassist, composer, was trained at the Army Music School
 Horst Fischer (1930–1986), trumpeter, was trained at the Army Music School
 Johann Gottfried Herder (1744–1803), poet, theologian and philosopher, worked from 1771 to 1775 as the main preacher, superintendent and consistorial councilor in Bückeburg
 Wilhelm Külz (1875–1948), politician, was mayor from 1904 to 1912, from 1909 lord mayor in Bückeburg and in 1926 interior minister in the cabinets of chancellors Hans Luther and Wilhelm Marx
 James Last (1929–2015), bassist, composer and bandleader, was trained at the Army Music School
 Louise Lehzen (1784–1870), from 1814 to 1842 Gouvernante Queen Victoria lived from 1842 until her death in 1870 in Bückeburg
 Karl Lieffen (1926–1999), actor, was trained at the Army Music School
 Hermann Löns (1866–1914), journalist and writer, was from 1907 to 1909 editor of the Schaumburg-Lippische Landes-Zeitung (=newspaper)
 Timo Maas (born 1969), musician
 Iwan Müller (1786–1854), composer and instrument maker

 Les Scheinflug (born 1938), Australian international football player and coach of their national team
 Heinrich Strack (1805–1880), architect
 Ernst Torgler (1893–1963), politician, from 1929 to 1933 KPD faction chairman in Reichstag and one of the defendants in the Reichstagsbrand process, worked from 1945 until 1948 in the Bückeburg city administration
 August von Herder (1776–1838), geologist and mineralogist
 Karl von Plettenberg (1852–1938), general of the infantry, lived in Bückeburg

Notes

References

External links
 
Schloss Bückeburg
 Helicopter Museum Bückeburg
Obernkirchen Children's Choir

Towns in Lower Saxony
Schaumburg
Principality of Schaumburg-Lippe